Eddie Gordon (born Edmund Richard Gordon; 9 February 1959 in Biggin Hill, Farnborough, Kent) is an English music journalist, producer, DJ and music business personality.

Early and personal life
Born in Biggin Hill, Gordon was raised in Gravesend, Kent. He was educated at Cecil Road Infant and Primary school in Northfleet, Kent and Northfleet School for Boys. He then attended Gravesend Technical College to study Advanced Level English language and literature.

Gordon is married, and lives in Los Angeles, California

Early life
As a young lad Gordon passionately collected 45 single records of the 1950s, 60s and 70s, buying them with his secondary school dinner money from his school friends Mum's who "had a box of old singles from their younger days", he immersed himself in the different styles of songs A and B sides from the UK and the USA. 

Aged 13, first brand new 7" (45rpm) he bought was Michael Jackson's cover version of Bill Withers hit Ain't No Sunshine, released in the UK in May 1972. Playing his collection at home on a Dansette record player, Gordon was fascinated by the song's, themes and lyrics of love; ability to paint virtual pictures; and how they resultantly engaged with the listener. Gordon's first DJing was in 1974 at the age of 15 in a Northfleet Church hall and later at 16 selecting music at friends parties

Early Working life
At 16 years old Gordon completed his secondary education at Northfleet School for Boys in June 1975, employed full-time immediately at Cosy Glide in Northfleet, an aluminium Door and Window manufacturer. December 1975 Gordon left Cosy Glide to take up a previously held position as a Laboratory Assistant for the aircraft paint manufacturing company Dufay Titanine before moving in 1977 to work as a Laboratory Assistant for Britannia Refining Metals. Early 1980 Gordon was employed by the Royal Mail and stationed at the main Post Office in High Holborn, London WC1, Gordon's last 'normal' job until taking up DJing full-time in 1982. From 1977 to 1980 Gordon took evening classes at Gravesend Technical College to study O Level then Advanced level in English Language and English Literature. A period of his life that gave Gordon the necessary education to later write weekly newspaper columns.

Music Journalist
Starting out as a DJ and music journalist in 1982 in his hometown Gravesend, Eddie Gordon wrote a weekly column for the Gravesend and Dartford Reporter and Kent Extra before being invited to write a weekly music page for Kent's major county newspaper the Kent Messenger, a position he held from 1982 to 1991. Nine years of weekly Gordon "Sound Spot" columns writing about artists from all genres of music to fully cater for the very diverse Kent readership. The Kent Messenger won the Weekly Newspaper of the Year title in the Regional Press Awards for 1988 and then went on to collect the title of overall regional newspaper. It's one of the highest accolades for a paid-for weekly paper in the UK.

DJ career
From 1984 through to 1988 Eddie was regularly booked by major London event promoters as the support DJ for BBC Radio 1 DJs and Capital Radio DJs working in the big towns and cities of South East of England. This was a rich period for Eddie Gordon's DJ career with various awards Gravesend and Dartford Reporter 'DJ of the Year 1984–1985', Radio Kent '1986 Club of the Year' with The Slammer, Kent Evening Post '1986 Club of the Year' with The Slammer, Kent Evening Post 1987 Kent Club of the Year with The Sleeze and in 1989 Eddie Gordon was Kent 'Music Man of the Year' – Kent Evening Post.
Throughout the 1980s Eddie Gordon was responsible for introducing the music for the Frank Warren Boxing Shows on the ITV channel with the boxers emerging from the dressing room to a fanfare of music to arouse the audience, which is now a regular part of all world championship televised boxing. The events held at the Royal Albert Hall, London, were major ITV programmes of the era.
Also from the mid to the late 1980s Eddie spotted and supported the emerging DJ talents of Tim Westwood BBC Radio 1, Trevor Nelson MBE BBC Radio 1, Gilles Peterson BBC Radio 1, Norman Jay MBE, CJ Macintosh and Paul Oakenfold at his Gravesend club night The Slammer and in his weekly music column Sounds Spot in the county newspaper the Kent Messenger.

DJ Agency
In 1985, a local Gravesend DJ Pete Tong personally requested to be added to Eddie Gordon's DJ Management/Agency roster which included BBC Radio London's Jeff Young, Radio Kent's Rod Lucas and the UK Club DJ of the Year Colin Hudd. Eddie's Agency was the first of its kind in the UK devoted to Radio DJs playing Dance music. Eddie managed Pete Tong of BBC Radio 1 for 20 years from 1984 to 2004 and Jeff Young of BBC Radio 1 from 1985 to 1992. in 1999 Eddie set up the DJ Agency IMD Ltd with DJs Pete Tong and Carl Cox heading the roster with a vision of the worldwide stage for Pete Tong.

The digital era/USA Billboard panels
21 September 2002 Eddie Gordon was invited by USA Billboard magazine as the only European representative to co-chair a closed-room key discussion at the Billboard Summit in New York to discuss the threat of the new world technology to the traditional music business with 69 heads of America's record labels. Eddie opened and closed his participation in this unique meeting by predicting that digital delivery would be 'the future' of the world's music business.

USA Billboard Magazine Dance Music Summit 2006 – Las Vegas Wrapup Eddie Gordon (Music 2 Mix) predicted this on a DMS panel more than five years ago to an almost dismissive audience, stressing the importance of building an audience. A vision confirmed 7 months later by the unveiling of Apple's iTunes in March 2003, which is now largest music retailer in the USA. 4 Apr 2008. iTunes 'biggest US music seller' group Wal-Mart to become the largest music retailer in the US, an independent study has said...

Eddie has moderated The Future of Digital Distribution at USA Billboard Summit in New York in 2003, attended panels as a speaker in 2004 and 2005 including a keynote speech at the Amsterdam Dance Event (ADE) – MP3 the Future of Music Promotion in Holland.

USA Billboard magazine DMS 2003 – The (Internet) Revolution will be Televised Eddie Gordon said that the 5 majors are concerned about marketshares, but they have to get on the internet and dance with the kids or die.

Winter Music Conference 2004 – Other Parties Future Music. Michael Paoletta,. Derek Graves, Seven. Eddie Gordon, Debra Eriksen. PlexiPR Party. Steve Porter. Betty Kang. Hed Kandi Party.

Eddie moderated a panel at the first USA Billboard Magazine Summit in Las Vegas 20 September 2006 titled 'Across The Pond' "The iPod is the Elvis revolution but the iPod plus the phone will be the Beatles revolution." EG quote at Billboard Magazine Conference, Las Vegas. Sep 2006

DJ In The Mix in London to KINGS of Spins Los Angeles, USA
June 2003 Eddie Gordon launched the world's first online digital promotion system for DJs with DJinTheMix which had an exclusive link to the then newly formed iTunes from Apple Inc. The following year DJinTheMix was nominated as a finalist in the Orange New Business Ventures in London and IMEA at Popkomm in Berlin, Germany. By the turn of 2005 Eddie Gordon introduced a new digital marketing service to radio stations worldwide with M2M and in April 2008 launched Media 2 Radio in the USA. The promotional work of DJITM to KINGS of Spins has helped to bring awareness and attention to over 5'000 new releases for artists plus record labels from around the world

The Grammy Awards. Hollywood
From 2010 to 2017, Gordon was invited to be a member of the Electronica / Dance Grammys Screening committee in Los Angeles by the chairman of the panel to assist the selection process for the year's best dance releases.

The British Broadcasting Corporation
Gordon joined BBC Radio 1 as a freelance producer in the early 1990, and introduced a host of new programming ideas and DJ talent including Pete Tong, Danny Rampling, Judge Jules, Seb Fontaine, Fergie and Carl Cox. For two years from 1995 to 1997 Gordon co-produced the Danny Rampling's Saturday evening BBC Radio 1 show The Love Groove Dance Party on alternate weekends with Jeff Young.

BBC Radio 1 Essential Mix

From the early 1992, Gordon had been receiving weekly two-hour long mixes on cassette from DJ's Tony Humphries on New York's Hot 96, and Frankie Knuckles at KISS 100. Gordon pitched the idea of a UK based electronic dance music show, with an emphasis on house, that show-cased different DJs and styles of music to offer an outlet for UK dance music. With voice-overs by Pete Tong, the first show was broadcast in 1994, produced by Gordon and airing from 01.00am to 03.00am. The show was subject to scheduling adjustments over the subsequent fifteen years, varying in duration from 2 hours to 3.5 hours, broadcast within the time frame from 01.00am to 06.00am. The show was the first BBC production to broadcast live from Ibiza, Spain. In addition, a one-hour Sunday edition of the programme was broadcast at 7.00pm from April 1992 to April 1993, called "The Essential Selection - Part 2". In 1997 IPC-produced magazine Muzik Mag named the show Radio Show of the Year in 1997, and a Sony Silver Award in 1997 for the Goa Mix presented by DJ Paul Oakenfold. Gordon left the show in 2004, when it changed to a different production company. The Essential Mix is presently the longest running Radio Mix show in the world.
"The Essential Mix Changed My Life"

BBC Radio 1 and Ibiza
Gordon took the Essential Mix to Ibiza in 1995, the first BBC produced show to air live from the noted club-scene holiday island, by recording an Essential Mix show set of DJ Nicky Holloway at the Ku club (now Privilege). The following year, Gordon persuaded the station's Managing Director Andy Parfitt to broadcast the "Essential Selection" show live from the Café del Mar and the Essential Mix from Amnesia in Ibiza; in 1998 when playing a set there for the Essential Mix. DJ Carl Cox's first ever live recording on the infamous Terrace for BBC Radio 1, produced by Gordon, won two awards in 1998, BBC Radio 1 Essential Mix Show of the Year and Muzik Mags BBC Radio 1 Essential Mix Show of the Year. Gordon was at the forefront of the Balearic beat worldwide explosion, and in celebration in 2005 BBC Radio 1 celebrated 10 years of broadcasting from Ibiza, followed by even more high profile 20 year celebrations in 2015.

BBC Radio 1 Millennium
From 1998-2000 Gordon was responsible for innovating and delivering his vision of the BBC Radio 1 One World Millennium year 2000 celebration show. Starting with Carl Cox from Bondi Beach in Sydney, Australia, followed by: Danny Rampling in Cape Town, South Africa; Dave Pearce from Glasgow, Scotland; Pete Tong from Liverpool; Junior Vasquez from New York City. Cox and Gordon then took a 9 hour flight westward across the International Date Line (IDL) from Sydney at 4am 1 January 2000, landing at 8pm Friday 31 December 1999 in Honolulu to produce final leg of the Millennium celebration at the Kakaako Waterfront Park in Honolulu, Hawaii. This allowed Cox and Gordon to both open and close the  broadcast.

BBC 6 Music
From 18 to 23 July 2011, Gordon produced and co-presented a 10-hour radio documentary A Piece of Paradise for the BBC 6 Music on the legendary Manhattan, New York nightclub Paradise Garage and its DJ Larry Levan. The shows were aired in one hour series Monday to Friday at midnight and a special 5-hour show on Saturday featuring a recorded live broadcast from inside the 'Garage in 1979. The show has been repeated by BBC 6 Music three times in entirety.

Internet radio
In 2000 Gordon saw the potential of dual-broadcasting shows via both the radio and the internet, with live audio and video camera images being beamed around the planet on the World Wide Web. Starting in 2000 under his own management and broadcasting from Café Mambo in Ibiza, from 2003 BBC Radio 1 took over the venture, and continue to this day.

Record labelsMCA Records-Universal1988 Gordon was appointed, by MCA Records UK Head of Dance A&R Adrian Sykes, as MCA Records' Club Promotion Dance A&R. Together they scored 10 UK Top 40 hit records from the R&B urban/dance division; In September 1988 Eddie Gordon remixed Bobby Brown's "Don't Be Cruel" record with Timmy Regisford in New York for MCA Records UK, helping Bobby Brown to achieve his first Top 20 UK hit record off his debut album which sold in excess of 300,000 copies in the UK.
The Mac Band – Roses Are Red – UK No. 8
Pebbles – Girlfriend – UK No. 8
Rose Royce – Carwash – UK No. 8
Eric B & Rakim – Follow The Leader – UK No. 21
Pebbles – Mercedes Boy – UK No. 40
Bobby Brown – Don't Be Cruel – UK No. 13
Bobby Brown – My Prerogative – UK No. 6
Bobby Brown – Every Little Step – UK No. 4
Kraze – The Party – UK No. 29
The Mac Band – Stalemate – UK No. 40
Funky Worm – The Hustle – UK No. 13
Sheena Easton – The Lover in Me – UK No. 15Motown Records, RCA Records, Arista Records1989 BMG Eddie Gordon was appointed as the Head of Dance Music for the labels RCA Records, Arista Records, Motown Records and Deconstruction Records. Eddie Gordon promoted 10 hit records into the UK Top 40 Hit Records Chart in this 12-month period including the record by Black Box called "Ride On Time", a ground breaking No. 1 UK hit record for 6 weeks, Lisa Stansfield – "All Around The World", also a No. 1 hit record and Public Enemy with Fight The Power from the Spike Lee movie Do The Right Thing.

In the studio in 1989 Gordon remixed hit records for Lisa Stansfield with "This Is The Right Time" and "All Around The World" both on Arista Records as well as hit records for The Temptations with "All I Want From You" and the Gerald Alston song "Activated" both on Motown Records, The Blow Monkeys' hit records "This Is Your Life" and "Choice" plus the Alisha Warren song "Touch Me" all on RCA Records. Eddie Gordon also edited the UK radio version of the Aretha Franklin and Whitney Houston hit record "It Isn't, It Wasn't, It Ain't Never Gonna Be" giving the US company Arista Records their only successful campaign outside of North America with that recording.Atlantic Records1990 Gordon is signed to Warner Brothers, Elektra, Atlantic Records and was responsible for breaking the USA act En Vogue with the record "Hold On", from the million selling album Born to Sing and the Family Stand classic record "Ghetto Heaven" both for Atlantic Records plus having hits with the Atlantic Records House Music giants Ten City with Whatever Makes You Happy and Superficial People whilst on Warner Brothers Eddie enjoyed successful campaigns with Ultra Naté and "It's Over Now", A Way of Life and "Tripping on Your Love", and with The Jungle Brothers' "What U Waitin' 4?" and "Doing Our Own Dang". In the studio Eddie Gordon and CJ Mackintosh remixed the Dr. Dre produced Portrait of A Masterpiece for The D.O.C.Polydor/Urban Records1991 Gordon is appointed Head of the Urban Division of Polydor Records covering the labels Polydor, M&G, Slamm, Raiders and Love where he went on to help secure hit records for Tony! Toni! Toné! with "It Never Rains in Southern California", Cathy Dennis with "Touch Me (All Night Long)", Just A Little Time and Everybody Move on Polydor Records, Love Inc – Love Is the Message on Love Records as well as Zoé Sunshine on a Rainy Day for M&G Records plus scoring Record Mirror Club No. 1 records for D'Bora Dream and the James Taylor Quartet – Love The Life You Live.PWL-Sanctuary RecordsLate 1992 Gordon was invited into the world-famous recording studios known as The Hit Factory by Pete Waterman and together they produced the UK Single No. 3 hit record, West End feat. Sybil, The Love I Lost for Sanctuary Records. The song also stayed at No. 1 in the UK Club Charts for 4 weeks. Eddie's imprint for PWL, Sanctuary Records, also enjoyed No. 1 UK Club Chart positions with Wag Ya Tail – Xpand Ya Mind, Key West – Looks Like I'm in Love Again and Club Z – I Wanna Be Someone.Song & Dance Music Promotion1993 Gordon forms a music promotion company called Song & Dance Promotions, achieving numerous No. 1 positions in the UK Club Charts for artistes including Whigfield, D-Mob, Lulu, Jon Secada, Dina Carroll, CeCe Peniston, Judy Cheeks, Eternal, Donna Summer, Yazz and KWS.Manifesto RecordsOctober 1994 Eddie Gordon founded the Manifesto label for Mercury Records UK. Along with Judge Jules, their first 14 Manifesto Records releases were all Top 40 UK hit records. Manifesto Records was Music Week's Dance Label of the Year 1995, 1996 and 1997. Eddie's 1995 signing of the Café del Mar – Ibiza Chill Out CD series for the world made Manifesto Records one of the UK's most successful dance labels of all time with the sales of the Café del Mar albums going over 15 million and they are still selling every summer 15 years later. The success of which created an entire genre of music called Chill-Out or Lounge. Another of Eddie's signings, Jose Padilla went on to be Nominated for a USA Latin Grammy with his second album Horizons. Manifesto Records scored nine #1's in the UK Record Mirror Chart to win the Music Week magazine's dance music label of 1996. One signing, Josh Wink – Higher State of Consciousness, actually hit the UK Top 10 twice at # 7 in consecutive years 1995 and 1996. A feat never to be repeated for an underground techno dance record. Eddie left Manifesto Records in 1997 suffering from exhaustion and feeling that Universal were not totally supportive of the artists or projects signed to the label. Five years later in 2002, Lucian Grainge the chairman and chief executive of Universal Music Group International congratulated Eddie personally for saving Mercury Records UK with the success of the signings to Manifesto Records in-particular the Café del Mar – Ibiza Chill Out CD series which Lucian compared to signing a smaller version of U2, the rock band, due to the income it generated for the company with its multi-million worldwide sales.

Gusto – Disco's Revenge – UK Club Chart No. 1
Donna Summer – State of Independence – UK Club Chart No. 1
Todd Terry – Keep on Jumpin' – UK Club Chart No. 1
Josh Wink – Higher State of Consciousness – UK Club Chart No. 1
Dina Carroll – Mind Body & Soul – UK Club Chart No. 1
David Morales & The Bad Yard Club – In Da Ghetto – UK Club Chart No. 1
Boris Dlugosch – Keep Pushin On – UK Club Chart No. 1
Byron Stingily – Get Up Everybody – UK Club Chart No. 1
Gusto – Let's All Chant – UK Club Chart No. 1Neo Records'''

1998 Eddie started his independent label, Neo Records, succeeding with the biggest selling dance record of the year 2000 with Sandstorm by Darude, licensed for the world and hitting No. 3 in the UK Singles Chart. Another Neo Records signing Ann Lee's 2 Times went one place better at No. 2 in the UK Singles Chart.

Producer/Artist: remixes, production and aliases
In an extension to his previous work at the record labels, from 1988 to 1996 Gordon became at first a producer and freelance remixer of various artistes records, and then an artist - as a front man producer and the hub of any "band" - in his own right. The function of both producer and artist was fulfilled under a series of aliases, including: WestEnd; EG; Ed-Did-It; and EGor.

Under these alias labels, Gordon remixed over 75 records for various labels and record companies for mainly the UK, European club scene and North America. This included six records off one album for Eternal from their debut album Always & Forever the songs "Stay", "Crazy", "Just a Step from Heaven", "Sweet Funky Thing", "Save Our Love", and "So Good", all of which went to No. 1 in the UK Club Charts and helped the Eternal album sell 3 million copies.West End (not to be confused with the Austrian Eurovision Song Contest entry of 1983), also enjoyed Club Chart Number 1 success with Dina Carroll "Here", "Ain't No Man" and "Express", Donna Summer "Melody of Love" and Toni Braxton "Breathe Again".

Awards
Aside from numerous record label awards with Manifest Records and Neo Records, plus awards for the Essential Mix Radio 1 show, Gordon's enjoyed a successful DJ career with various awards Gravesend and Dartford Reporter 'DJ of the Year 1984-1985', Radio Kent '1986 Club of the Year' with The Slammer, Kent Evening Post '1986 Club of the Year' with The Slammer, Kent Evening Post 1987 Kent Club of the Year with The Sleeze and in 1989 Eddie Gordon was Kent 'Music Man of the Year' - Kent Evening Post. 2014 Gordon was made a Founding Member of the Chicago-based American DJ Hall Of Fame for his Excellence in the Advancement, Expansion and Acceptance of Dance Music around the World.

Discography and West End Remixes plus productions
From 1988 to 1998 Eddie Gordon, using the names "West End", "Ed-Did-It" or "EGor", remixed over 75 records for various labels and record companies in the UK music business including six records off one album for Eternal from their debut album Always & Forever'' the songs "Stay", "Crazy", "Just a Step from Heaven", "Sweet Funky Thing", "Save Our Love", and "So Good", all of which went to No. 1 in the UK Club Charts and helped the Eternal album sell 3 million copies. The UK music charts love affair with girl groups was created from this success. West End also enjoyed Club Chart Number 1 success with Dina Carroll "Here", "Ain't No Man" and "Express", Donna Summer "Melody of Love" and Toni Braxton "Breathe Again". Further information in the discography below.

References

External links

1959 births
Living people
English male journalists
English record producers
British music industry executives
British house musicians
A&R people
People from Gravesend, Kent
British DJs
Club DJs
DJs from London
Remixers
English radio personalities
Electronic dance music DJs